Giovanni Guzzo (born 1986 in Porlamar, Margarita Island, Venezuela) is a Venezuelan violinist.

Born in Venezuela to parents of Italian and Venezuelan heritage, he started the violin at the age of six under the teachings of Emil Friedman and Luis Miguel Gonzales. At the age of 12 he became the youngest violinist to win 1st prize at the XII National Violin Competition “Juan Bautista Plaza” in Venezuela, leading to acclaimed performances nationwide. He then continued his studies with Zakhar Bron at the Reina Sofía School of Music in Madrid and later moved to London to study at the Royal Academy of Music with Maurice Hasson.

Giovanni performs regularly in some of the most prestigious venues and festivals worldwide, including the Wigmore Hall, Lincoln centre in New York, the BBC Proms in London, Salzburg and Verbier festivals; performing with some of the today’s leading conductors such as Sir Simon Rattle, Ivan Fischer, Semyon Bychkov, Marin Alsop, Herbert Blomstedt, Reinhard Goebel and Juanjo Mena.

A protégé of the renowned French violinist Maurice Hasson, Giovanni was granted a scholarship at the age of 16 to study at the Royal Academy of Music in London, graduating with the highest honours, and consequently being appointed as one of the youngest violin Professors in the institution’s long history.

Giovanni has performed on several occasions for the British Royal Family, most recently performing for Her Majesty Queen Elizabeth II on the famous 'Viotti ex-Bruce' Stradivarius violin (one of the most precious Stradivarius violins in the world). He has also been awarded with Her Majesty the Queen’s commendation for Excellence and HRH Princess Alice's Prize (presented by HRH The Duchess of Gloucester).

Giovanni is concertmaster of the Camerata Salzburg.

Giovanni Guzzo plays on a 1751 Gennaro Gagliano violin, on extended loan to him; and a bow by T. Baker, awarded to him by J&A Beare.

References

External links
 Official Website

Italian classical violinists
Male classical violinists
Venezuelan classical violinists
Alumni of the Royal Academy of Music
Venezuelan people of Italian descent
Living people
1986 births
People from Nueva Esparta
21st-century classical violinists
21st-century Italian male musicians